Osmond Memorial Church, previously known as Wesleyan Methodist Church is  located at 56, S. N. Banerjee Road, Taltala, Kolkata, West Bengal, India. The Church was established by Walter Osmond, a Methodist minister in 1868.

History 
Walter Osmond, a Methodist minister came to Kolkata (then Calcutta) in 1864  as a missionary evangelist and a social worker. His aim was to serve the poor and distressed people of the city. He established the Church in 1868. At that time it was known as Wesleyan Methodist Church. Later it was named Osmond Memorial Church in the memory of the founder who served the poor people of Kolkata for nearly 30 years.

Congregations 
The Church has four congregations:– 
~ The Bengali Congregation (at Taltala), 
~ The Santhali Congregation  ( at Taltala),
~ Kamardanga Chapel (at 2/2, Pottery Road) and 
~ Ballygaunge Church ( at Bondel Road ).

See also 
 St. John's Church, Kolkata

References

External links 
 

Churches in Kolkata
Tourist attractions in Kolkata